Roaring Gap is an unincorporated community in the Cherry Lane Township of Alleghany County, North Carolina, United States, situated near the border with Wilkes County. Home to three private golf communities, Roaring Gap is a popular summer colony.

History
Roaring Gap was established in 1890 as a summer resort by Elkin, North Carolina industrialist Alexander Chatham, one of the founders of the Chatham Manufacturing Company.  The community derives its name from the noise the wind makes when rushing through the mountains located there. Roaring Gap has 3 Golf and Country Clubs in its area; High Meadows Country Club, Roaring Gap Club and Olde Beau Golf Club. YMCA Camp Cheerio, which is owned by the YMCA in High Point, is also in Roaring Gap.

The Rock House and William T. Vogler Cottage are listed on the National Register of Historic Places.

Demographics
Roaring Gap's Zip Code Tabulation Area (Zip Code 28668) has a population of 142 as of the 2000 census.  The population is 52.1% male and 47.9% female.  About 98.6% of the population is white and 1.4% is Hispanic.

The median household income is $61,154 with 0% of the population living below the poverty line.

Antioch United Methodist Church
Antioch United Methodist Church is a United Methodist country chapel located across from High Meadows Country Club. The church also has a cemetery, with graves from the 19th century up to the 21st century. The church follows a Primitive Methodist tradition.  Antioch is a part of the Mountain Valley Charge.  Services are held each Sunday at 9:00 AM.  The minister then travels to White Rock United Methodist Church in Thurmond NC and then to Grassy Creek United Methodist Church in State Road NC.

See also
 Stone Mountain State Park
 Camp Cheerio

References

 

Unincorporated communities in Alleghany County, North Carolina
Unincorporated communities in North Carolina
Populated places established in 1890